Mental (Past: Mental: It Can Be Your Love Story), better known as Rana Pagla: The Mental, is a 2016 Bangladeshi psychological-action thriller film featuring Shakib Khan, Nusrat Imrose Tisha with Achol, Misha Sawdagor, Shiba Shanu, Don and Shimul Khan in supporting roles. The film is directed by Shamim Ahamed Roni, with a screenplay written by Abdullah Zahir and Daud Hussein. The film is produced by Saiful Alam Chowdhury( Parvez) under the banner of Banglaxpress Films.

The first theatrical look of the film was revealed on 1 February 2015. The core plot of the movie was partially based on the 2013 Kannada movie Bachchan with coffee shop comedy sequences borrowed from 2013 Telugu movie Balupu. The film was released on Eid al-Fitr of 7 July 2016.

Plot
An underworld mafia steals valuable mineral resources and sell them over to international crime organization . Simi (Nusrat Imrose Tisha); a news reporter finds out and exposes the whole criminal chain to the media, despite all threats from them. An unknown, mysterious but affectionate and intimidating man comes up to help, The story revolves around revealing the true identity of him and his link to the Underworld.

Khan portrays the role of a generous businessman. Simi, portrayed by Tisha, is his love interest, and a crime news reporter. who is working on exposing corruptions of influential people of the society. Simi takes steps to fight the corrupt people, but soon realizes the influence of those men. Khan changes after a violent encounter in which his love interest, Simi was killed. The plot builds up around his quest to avenge the killing with aid of her research, in which she documents her encounter with her killers, who she planned to expose of corruption

Cast
 Shakib Khan as Shahriar Tanvir Rana
 Nusrat Imrose Tisha as Simi, an news reporter
 Achol as Achol/Mehruba Siddiqui
 Misha Sawdagor
 Siraj Haider
 Amir Siraji
 Don
 Shiba Shanu
 Pervez Chowdhury
 Sanko Panja
 DJ Shohel
 Shimul Khan
 Kamal Patekar
 Jadu Azad
 Afzal Sharif
 Subrata
 Rebeka Rouf
 Kabila
 Ratan Khan
 Roman
 Shiuly
 Foysal
 Pritha
 Mahi
 SA Haque Alik
 Amir Fakir
 Pavel 
 Rifat
 Debashish Biswas as Special Appearance
 Moushumi Hamid as Special Appearance in the song Khaina Jonab
 Sabrina Porshi as Special Appearance in the song Mon Najehal

Production
By early 2014, Bangladesh Express Films announced its production and were preparing for the shooting for the film. The Abhi Pictures picked up the distribution rights of the film. The shooting officially started in Sylhet, Bangladesh in September 2014.

Casting
Shakib Khan was the first to be roped for the film by director Shamim Ahamed Roni. However, the director has considered many actresses for the lead role but later finalized Tisha, Achol and Porshi for lead female roles.
The studio approached Porshi for the film to play the role of a musician while Tisha and Achol were roped to play news reporters.

Filming
The official filming of Mental began in November 2014 in Dhaka. Scenes were filmed in Dhaka, and Sylhet while several scenes were filmed abroad.

Soundtracks

The soundtrack of the film was written by Prosen, Riddhi, Shomeshwar Oli, Zahid Hasan Abhi, Zahid Akbar and Rabiul Islam Jibon while the music was directed by Dabbu Ghoshal and Akassh. In November 2014, Shaan recorded the second track. In December 2014, Jojo recorded the third track item number of the movie. The track "Bolte Baki Koto Ki" was released as a single on 23 January 2015.

Release

Controversy
The film faced a lot of controversies after the release of the first track "Bolte Baki Koto Ki" due to alleged copyright infringement. The same tune with slightly different lyrics entitled "Bolte Bolte Cholte Cholte" was released on 20 January 2015 by Imran Mahmudul, three days before the release of Mentals first track. Although the song composition is very similar, both Prosen and Shafiq Tuhin were credited for the same song. Later it was confirmed that Imran Mahmudul is the legal copyright holder of the song and he was originally commissioned for the song by the producers, but later dropped out due to professional indifference.

References

External links
 

2016 films
2016 psychological thriller films
2016 romantic drama films
Bengali-language Bangladeshi films
Bangladeshi action thriller films
Films scored by Akassh
Films scored by Dabbu
Bangladeshi films about revenge
2016 masala films
Films about amnesia
2016 directorial debut films
2010s Bengali-language films
Films directed by Shamim Ahamed Roni
Bangladeshi remakes of Indian films
Films shot in Sylhet
Films set in Sylhet